Cryosophila bartlettii is a species of flowering plant in the family Arecaceae. It is found only in Panama.

References

bartlettii
Flora of Panama
Endangered plants
Taxonomy articles created by Polbot